Luster Heights Prison Farm is a satellite facility of Anamosa State Penitentiary operated by the Iowa Department of Corrections. It is located in the Yellow River State Forest about five miles south of Harpers Ferry. It is situated in Fairview Township, in southeastern Allamakee County. The minimum-security facility houses approximately 60 male inmates, with a capacity of 88.

The inmates do work for the Iowa Department of Natural Resources in maintaining the state forest. In particular, they work at a DNR-owned sawmill where 150,000 board feet (350 m³) of lumber are annually processed.

In 2006, the Animal Welfare Foundation of Iowa started a program at the facility for inmates to train stray dogs for later adoption.  

In 2017 this facility was closed, here is part of news article: "According to DOC Director Jerry Bartruff in a statement on Feb. 8, the move to shutter the doors at Luster Heights—along with the Lodge Unit in Clarinda, the John Bennett Unit in Fort Madison and the Sheldon Residential Treatment Facility—was made in order to cut the DOC’s fiscal year 2017 budget by $5.5 million."

Sources
 Iowa Department of Corrections
 Daily prisoner counts
 
 Yellow River State Forest
 Sawmill
 Prison dog adoption program
 Topographic map from TopoQuest

Prisons in Iowa
Buildings and structures in Allamakee County, Iowa